The following is a comprehensive list of universities in Myanmar, categorised by state and region. Nearly all major and national universities in Myanmar are in Yangon Region and Mandalay Region. The Burmese higher education system is entirely state-run, and its universities and colleges are organised along their fields of studies. The country's 150-plus universities and colleges are administered by various government ministries. For example, liberal arts and science universities such as Yangon University and Mandalay University, and technological universities are run by the Ministry of Education, the medical schools are run by the Ministry of Health,  Private colleges offer international joint diploma to the residents in some fields such as engineering, computing, and Business administration.

By state/division

Ayeyarwady Region
 Javana Buddhist Academy(JBA) Kyaiklat
 Bogalay Education College
 Computer University, Hinthada
 University of Computer Studies (Maubin)
 Computer University, Pathein
 Government Technical Institute, Wakema
 Hinthada University
 Maubin University
 Myanmar Union Adventist Seminary
 Myaungmya Education College
 Pathein Education College
 Pathein University
 Technological University, Hinthada
 Technological University, Maubin
 Technological University, Pathein
State Agricultural Institute, Myaungmya

Bago Region
 Bago University
 Computer University, Pyay
 Computer University, Taungoo
 Paku Divinity School
 Pyay Education Degree College
 Pyay Technological University
 Pyay University
 Taungoo Education Degree College
 Taungoo University
 Technological University, Taungoo

Chin State
 Chin Christian College 
 Union Theological College Matupi  
 Zomi Theological College
 Hakha College

Kachin State
 Bhamo University
 Computer University, Bhamo
 Computer University, Myitkyina
 Government Technical College, Mohnyin
 Kachin Theological College
 Mohnyin Degree College
 Myitkyina Education College
 Myitkyina University
 Technological University, Bhamo
 Technological University, Myitkyina

Kayah State
 Computer University, Loikaw
 Loikaw University
 Technological University, Loikaw
Loikaw Education College

Kayin State
 Computer University, Hpa-An
 Hpa-An Education College
 Hpa-An University
 Technological University, Hpa-An

Magway Region
 University Of Computer Studies Magway
 University of Computer Studies (Pakokku)
 Yenangyaung Government Technical Institute
 Magway Education College
 Magway University
 Pakokku Education Degree College
 Pakokku University
 Technological University, Magway
 Technological University, Pakokku
 University of Community Health, Magway
 University of Medicine, Magway
 Pali University of Buddhism, Pakokku
 Yenangyaung University
 Government Technical Institute, Chauk
 Government Technical Institute, Thayet
 Government Technical Institute, Magway
 Pakokku Nursing College

Mandalay Region
 University of Mandalay
 Computer University, Mandalay
 Computer University, Meiktila
 Government Technical Institute, Kyaukpadaung
 Government Technical Institute, Pyinoolwin
 Government Technical Institute, Yamethin
 Defence Services Academy
 Defence Services Technological Academy
 Kyaukse University
 London Business University
 Mandalay Education College
 Mandalay Institute of Nursing
 Mandalay Regional Co-operative College
 Mandalay Technological University
 Mandalar Degree College
 Meiktila Education College
 Meiktila Institute of Economics
 Meiktila University
 Myanmar Aerospace Engineering University
 Myanmar Institute of Information Technology
 Myanmar Theological College, Mandalay
 Myingyan Degree College
 Nationalities Youth Resource Development Degree College, Mandalay
 State Pariyatti Sasana University, Mandalay
 Technological University, Kyaukse
 Technological University, Mandalay
 Technological University, Meiktila
 University of Computer Studies, Mandalay
 University of Culture, Mandalay
 University of Dental Medicine, Mandalay
 University of Distance Education, Mandalay
 University of Foreign Languages, Mandalay
 University of Forestry, Yezin
 University of Medical Technology, Mandalay
 University of Medicine, Mandalay
 University of Paramedical Science, Mandalay
 University of Pharmacy, Mandalay
 University of Technology, Yadanabon Cyber City
 University of Traditional Medicine, Mandalay
 University of Veterinary Science, Yezin
 Yadanabon University
 Yezin Agricultural University
 Myanmar Commercial Management Institute (MCMI)
 Mandalay Business School
 Myanmar Commercial University - MCU

Mon State
 Computer University, Thaton 
 Thaton Institute of Agriculture 
 Mawlamyine Education College
 Mawlamyine Institute of Education
 Mawlamyine University
 Technological University (Mawlamyine)
 Government Technical Institute (Mawlamyine)

Rakhine State
 Computer University, Sittwe
 Government Technical Institute, Kyaukphyu
 Government Technical Institute, Thandwe
 Kyaukphyu Education College
 Sittway University http://stu.edu.mm
 Taunggup College
 Technological University, Sittwe

Sagaing Region
 Computer University, Kalay
 Computer University, Monywa
 Technological University, Sagaing
 Sitagu World Buddhist University, Sagaing
 Government Technical College, Shwebo
 McNeilus Maranatha Christian College, Kalay
 Monywa Education College
 Monywa Institute of Economics
 Monywa University
 Sagaing Institute of Education
 Co-operative University, Sagaing
 Shwebo University
 Technological University, Monywa
 University for the Development of the National Races of the Union
 University of Kalay
 Technological University (Kalay)
 Nationalities Youth Resource Development Degree College, Sagaing
Sagaing University
Sagaing University of Education

Shan State
 Computer University, Lashio
 Computer University, Kyaingtong
 Computer University, Panglong
 Computer University, Taunggyi
 Kyaingtong University
 Lashio University
 Lashio Education College
 Panglong University
 Taunggyi Education College
 Taunggyi University
 Technological University, Kyaingtong
 Technological University, Lashio
 Technological University, Panglong
 Technological University, Taunggyi
 University of Medicine, Taunggyi
 University of Computer Studies (Taunggyi)
 Shan State Buddhist University, Taunggyi, Shan State

Tanintharyi Region
 Computer University, Dawei
 Computer University, Myeik
 Dawei Education College
 Dawei University
 Myeik University
 Technological University, Dawei
 Technological University, Myeik

Yangon Region
Academy of Management and Technology (AMT)
 Central Co-operative College, Phaunggyi
 Co-operative University, Thanlyin
 City University, Yangon
 Dagon University
 Defence Services Institute of Nursing and Paramedical Science
 Defence Services Medical Academy
 Hlegu Education College
 Info Myanmar University
 International Theravada Buddhist Missionary University
 Karen Baptist Theological Seminary
 Lorrain Theological College
 Myanmar Institute of Theology
 Myanmar Imperial University
 Myanmar Maritime University
 National Management University of Myanmar
 Nationalities Youth Resource Development Degree College, Yangon
 State Pariyatti Sasana University, Yangon
 Strategy First University
 STI Myanmar University
 Technological University, Hmawbi
 Technological University, Thanlyin
 Thingangyun Education College
 University of Computer Studies, Yangon
 University of Culture, Yangon
 University of Dental Medicine, Yangon
 University of Distance Education, Yangon
 University of East Yangon
 University of Foreign Languages, Yangon
 University of Information Technology, Yangon
 University of Medical Technology, Yangon
 University of Medicine 1, Yangon
 University of Medicine 2, Yangon
 University of Paramedical Science, Yangon
 University of Pharmacy, Yangon
 University of Public Health, Yangon
 University of West Yangon
 Victoria University College
 Vivekananda American University (VAU), Yangon
 West Yangon Technological University
 Yangon Institute of Economics
 Yangon Institute of Education
 Yangon Institute of Marine Technology
 Yangon Institute of Nursing
 Yangon Technological University
 Yangon University
 Yankin Education College
 Yangon University of Education
 Myanmar Commercial University - MCU
 ATBC - International College
 ATBC - Ayeyarwady Technology & Business College

Gallery

See also
 Education in Myanmar

References

 CAMEMIS - Free Education Management System
 Higher education in Myanmar

Universities
Myanmar
Myanmar